Pseudoclanis occidentalis is a moth of the family Sphingidae. It is known from Sierra Leone, Ivory Coast, Ghana, Cameroon, Gabon, the Central African Republic and Kenya.

The larvae feed on Ficus natalensis, Ficus asperifolia, Ficus leprieurii, Ficus platyphylla, Ficus macrosperma, Ficus mucoso, Ficus umbellata, Urera camerunensis, Sterculia tragacantha, Loranthus and Celtis species.

References

Pseudoclanis
Moths described in 1903
Insects of Cameroon
Moths of Africa
Insects of the Democratic Republic of the Congo
Insects of Uganda
Fauna of the Central African Republic
Fauna of Gabon
Insects of West Africa
Insects of Tanzania